Friedrich Knauer may refer to:

 Friedrich Knauer (chemist) (1897–?), German physical chemist
 Friedrich Knauer (zoologist) (1850–1926), Austrian zoologist